A peak experience is an altered state of consciousness characterized by euphoria, often achieved by self-actualizing individuals. The concept was originally developed by Abraham Maslow in 1964, who describes peak experiences as "rare, exciting, oceanic, deeply moving, exhilarating, elevating experiences that generate an advanced form of perceiving reality, and are even mystic and magical in their effect upon the experimenter." There are several unique characteristics of a peak experience, but each element is perceived together in a holistic manner that creates the moment of reaching one's full potential. Peak experiences can range from simple activities to intense events; however, it is not necessarily about what the activity is, but the ecstatic, blissful feeling that is being experienced during it.

History
Peak experiences were originally described by psychologist Abraham Maslow as "moments of highest happiness and fulfillment" in his 1964 work Religions, Values, and Peak Experiences. To some extent the term represents Maslow's attempt to denominate those experiences which have generally been identified as religious experiences and whose origins have, by implication, been thought of as supernatural. Maslow (1970) believed the origin, core and essence of every known "high religion" was "the private, lonely, personal illumination, revelation, or ecstasy of some acutely sensitive prophet or seer" (p. 19).

Maslow's assertions about peak experience, along with his famous hierarchy of needs, were widely celebrated due to the theories' focus on the psychology of healthy people, which stood out in a time where the bulk of psychology research focused on psychological disorders.

In original peak experience research, Maslow utilized interviews and questionnaires to gather participants' testimonies of peak experience. These early studies suggested common triggers for peak experience included art, nature, sex, creative work, music, scientific knowledge, and introspection.

Historically, peak experience is associated with the psychological phenomenon flow. Peak experience is differentiated from flow due to a number of factors including subjective level of experience intensity: while peak experience denotes a high level of stimulation or euphoria, flow is not associated with an increased level of stimulation. For further differentiation, see "Peak Experiences in Self-Actualization" below.

Characteristics 
According to Maslow, often reported emotions in a peak experience include "wonder, awe, reverence, humility, surrender, and even worship before the greatness of the experience", and reality is perceived with "truth, goodness, beauty, wholeness, aliveness, uniqueness, perfection, completion, justice, simplicity, richness, effortlessness, playfulness, self-sufficiency".

An individual in a peak experience will perceive the following simultaneously:

 loss of judgment to time and space
 the feeling of being one whole and harmonious self, free of dissociation or inner conflict
 the feeling of using all capacities and capabilities at their highest potential, or being "fully functioning"
 functioning effortlessly and easily without strain or struggle
 feeling completely responsible for perceptions and behavior. Use of self-determination to becoming stronger, more single-minded, and fully volitional
 being without inhibition, fear, doubt, and self-criticism
 spontaneity, expressiveness, and naturally flowing behavior that is not constrained by conformity
 a free mind that is flexible and open to creative thoughts and ideas
 complete mindfulness of the present moment without influence of past or expected future experiences
 a physical feeling of warmth, along with a sensation of pleasant vibrations emanating from the heart area outward into the limbs.

Self-actualization
Self-actualization is a concept developed by Abraham Maslow that is characterized by one becoming all they want to be, and can be, by maximizing their potential. A common phenomenon that many self-actualized people experience is called flow, proposed by Mihaly Csikszentmihalyi. Flow has been described as a state of mind when one is using their full potential, completely immersed in their current activity, and are therefore not conscious of time, or anything else for that matter.

Self-actualized people often experience flow, as well as peak experiences. Although flow and peak experiences are often thought of as the same thing, they are different occurrences. While flow is a subjective conscious process that happens internally, peak experiences are describing an event that has occurred to someone who was functioning at optimal levels. Peak experiences are the actual outcome of an external occurrence, while flow is an internal mental process that may or may not precede a peak experience. Due to the nature and characteristics of self-actualized individuals, peak experiences often occur in their lives with their ability to perceive, accept, understand, and enjoy the journey of life.

Examples

Polyson (1985):
"Most of the peak experiences had occurred during athletic, artistic, religious, or nature experiences, or during intimate moments with a friend or family member."

Maslow (1962):
"Think of the most wonderful experience of your life: the happiest moments, ecstatic moments, moments of rapture, perhaps from being in love, or from listening to music or suddenly 'being hit' by a book or painting, or from some creative moment."

Specific examples of when peak experiences often occur:
Scientific discoveries; seeing or discovering some phenomenon for the first time
Extreme sports activities – mountain biking, motorcycling, mountain/rock climbing, sky diving, snowboarding
Musical talents – while playing an instrument alone, or with a group
Childhood experiences – experiences with close friends and loved ones in the developmental phases of early life

Implications 
Abraham Maslow considers the peak experience to be one of the most important goals of life, as it is an indication of self-actualization. This moment of feeling wholly and completely the true self makes the peak experience an essential component of identity. The aftereffects of the peak experience leave the individual to see himself and the world in a new way. He views himself more positively, he views life as worthwhile and meaningful, and most importantly, he seeks to repeat the experience. The peak experience is an exhibition of Maslow’s emphasis on the quest for positive growth maximizing potential as the true goal of human existence.

Plateau experience 
Maslow also recognized a related but distinct phenomenon of plateau experience. He wrote:

After Maslow's death, investigation into the nature of plateau experience per se "largely fizzled into obscurity."  However research into the related phenomenon of self-transcendence is potentially increasing.

See also
 Born again
 Meditation
 Spirituality

References

Further reading
 Craighead, W. Edward; Nemeroff, Charles B. (eds.) (2002). Peak experiences The Corsini Encyclopedia of Psychology and Behavioral Science, Volume 3. Wiley. (1156−1158).
 Gruel, Nicole (2015). The plateau experience: an exploration of its origins, characteristics, and potential.The Journal of Transpersonal Psychology, 47(1), 44−63. 
 Krippner, Stanley (1972). The plateau experience: A. H. Maslow and others. The Journal of Transpersonal Psychology, 4(2), 107–120.  
 

 

Mental states
Mysticism
Happiness
Positive psychology
Mystical union